This is a list of people who have served as Custos Rotulorum (Keeper of the Rolls) of Huntingdonshire.

 Sir Richard Cromwell bef. 1544
 William Cooke 1544–1553
 Sir Robert Tyrwhitt bef. 1558 – bef. 1562
 William Lawrence bef. 1562 – aft. 1564
 Sir James Dyer bef. 1573 – c. 1579
 Sir Christopher Wray c. 1579 – bef. 1584
 Sir Henry Cromwell bef. 1584–1604
 Sir Oliver Cromwell c. 1605–1646
 Interregnum
 Edward Montagu, 1st Earl of Sandwich 1660–1672
 Robert Montagu, 3rd Earl of Manchester 1672–1681
For later custodes rotulorum, see Lord Lieutenant of Huntingdonshire.

References
Institute of Historical Research - Custodes Rotulorum 1544-1646
Institute of Historical Research - Custodes Rotulorum 1660-1828

Huntingdonshire
History of Huntingdonshire